Steve Trimper is an American college baseball coach who is currently the head coach for the Stetson Hatters baseball team out of the ASUN Conference. Previously, he served as the head coach at Maine from 2006 to 2016 and Manhattan from 1999 to 2005.  An alumnus of Eastern Connecticut State University, Trimper played baseball there from 1990 to 1992 and was a member of the Warriors' 1990 Division III national championship team.

Coaching career

Assistant coaching
After he graduated from Eastern Connecticut in 1992, Trimper worked for two years as the associate head coach at Division III Wentworth.  His first Division I position came at Vermont, where he served as an assistant under head coach Bill Currier from 1995 to 1998. He also earned his master's degree in administration from the university in 1997.

During the summers of 1996 and 1997, Trimper was the head coach of the Eastern Tides of the New England Collegiate Baseball League.

Manhattan
Trimper replaced Gary Puccio as the head coach at Manhattan prior to the start of the 1999 season. In his seven years as head coach (1999–2005), the Jaspers went 172–174–2.

Manhattan finished with sub-.500 records in Trimper's first three seasons.  In 2002, his fourth, the team went 32–19; it was the school's first 30-win season and first winning season since 1971.  Trimper was named the 2002 MAAC Coach of the Year.  In 2003, the Jaspers finished with a .500 record (26–26), but went 15–10 in the MAAC to qualify for their first postseason appearance under Trimper.  This berth was the first of three consecutive MAAC Tournaments for Manhattan; the team's best showing was a runner-up finish in 2004.

During Trimper's time at Manhattan, two of his players were named MAAC Rookie of the Year: first basemen Chris Gaskin in 2002 and Matt Rizzotti in 2005.  Rizzotti was also named the 2005 MAAC Player of the Year.  Trimper also had two players selected in the MLB Draft: Gaskin and pitcher Mike Parisi, both in 2004.  Parisi later pitched for the St. Louis Cardinals.

Maine
When Maine head coach Paul Kostacopoulos left for Navy after the 2005 season, the school hired Trimper to replace him.  Trimper became the 24th head coach of Maine baseball.

In 2006, Trimper's first season, Maine qualified for the NCAA Tournament.  After a 32–20–1 (13–9 AEC) regular season, third baseman Kevin McAvoy was named America East Rookie of the Year, and Maine was seeded third in the America East Tournament.  The Black Bears swept through the tournament, defeating Stony Brook, Vermont, and Stony Brook again to win the championship and the conference's automatic bid to the NCAA Tournament.  At the Chapel Hill Regional, Maine went 0–2, losing 15–7 to top-seeded North Carolina and 21–19 to third-seeded UNC Wilmington.

The team went 1–2 in the conference tournament in 2007 and missed it in 2008 and 2009. The team had two more major award winners during this stretch: catcher Myckie Lugbauer won the program's second straight America East Rookie of the Year award in 2007, and outfielder Curt Smith was named conference Player of the Year in 2008.

From 2010 to 2014, Maine made five consecutive America East Tournament appearances.  In 2011, it finished second in the conference and made its second NCAA Tournament under Trimper.  After a 29–22 regular season, the Black Bears swept through the America East Tournament, defeating Binghamton, Stony Brook, and Albany.  Sent to the Chapel Hill Regional as a four-seed for the second tournament in a row, the team went 1–2; it lost its opener to host North Carolina, but eliminated second-seed FIU before being eliminated by James Madison. In 2013, Trimper got his 400th career win, and Maine won the America East's regular season championship before losing to Binghamton in the tournament finals.  The 2013 team won several major awards– Trimper was named America East Coach of the Year, shortstop Michael Fransoso was named Player of the Year, and Tommy Lawrence was named Pitcher of the Year.

Between 2006 and 2013, nine of Trimper's players have been selected in the MLB Draft. The highest selection was pitcher Jeff Gibbs, a ninth-round by the Arizona Diamondbacks in 2012.

Stetson
In December 2016, Trimper was named the head coach for the Stetson Hatters baseball team.
Stetson University Director of Athletics Jeff Altier introduced Steve Trimper as the 23rd head baseball coach in the history of the Hatters baseball program on December 21, 2016, at a news conference in the Hall of Fame room at the Edmunds Center.

Trimper made his second season(2018) at Stetson one to remember after leading the Hatters to a second-place finish in his inaugural run through the ASUN Conference.

In 2018 the Hatters rewrote much of the Stetson Baseball record book. The list of team and individual accomplishments was considerable.
Overall record: 48-11- tied for most wins in a season in program history.
ASUN record: 15-3 (1st place).
ASUN Tournament: 4-0 (Champions).
NCAA DeLand Regional: 3-0 (Champions)- first regional title in program history.
Home Record: 32-3 best in Melching Field history.
Finished season ranked in every national poll: Baseball America (12), Collegiate Baseball (10), USA Today Coaches Poll (13), D1Baseball.com (10).  Finished the 2018 season with a program record NCAA final RPI (7)
    
Six Hatters were selected in the MLB Draft in June, including Logan Gilbert by Seattle, who was selected in the 1st round (#16 overall)

Head coaching records

NCAA
Below is a table of Trimper's yearly records as a collegiate head baseball coach.

Collegiate summer
Below is a table of Trimper's records as a collegiate summer baseball head coach.

See also
 List of current NCAA Division I baseball coaches

References

External links
 Stetson profile

Year of birth missing (living people)
Living people
Eastern Connecticut State Warriors baseball players
Elon Phoenix baseball players
Maine Black Bears baseball coaches
Manhattan Jaspers baseball coaches
New England Collegiate Baseball League
Stetson Hatters baseball coaches
Vermont Catamounts baseball coaches
Wentworth Leopards baseball coaches
People from Newton, New Jersey
Sportspeople from Sussex County, New Jersey
Baseball players from New Jersey
Baseball coaches from New Jersey